Dafydd Gorlech (c. 1410 – c. 1490) was a Welsh language poet.

Dafydd's poetry is characterised by prophetic themes.  His other surviving work suggests that he was captured alongside Sir Roger Vaughan by Jasper Tudor. Sir Roger was executed whereas Dafydd survived.

Bibliography
Erwain H. Rheinallt (ed.), Gwaith Dafydd Gorlech (University of Wales, 1997)

Welsh-language poets
15th-century Welsh poets
Year of birth uncertain